Ras-related protein Rap-2b is a protein that in humans is encoded by the RAP2B gene. RAP2B belongs to the Ras-related protein family.

This intronless gene belongs to a family of RAS-related genes. The proteins encoded by these genes share approximately 50% amino acid identity with the classical RAS proteins and have numerous structural features in common. The most striking difference between the RAP and RAS proteins resides in their 61st amino acid: glutamine in RAS is replaced by threonine in RAP proteins. Evidence suggests that this protein may be polyisoprenylated and palmitoylated.

References

Further reading